National symbols of the United States are the symbols used to represent the United States of America.

List of symbols

See also

 Lists of United States state symbols

References

External links
 National Symbols and Icons

 
United States national
National symbols